Dianne Elizabeth Farmer (born 12 February 1961) is an Australian politician currently serving as the Minister for Employment and Small Business and Minister for Training and Skills of Queensland. She was first elected for the seat of Bulimba to the Queensland State Parliament for the Labor Party at the 2009 Queensland election but lost her seat at the 2012 election to Aaron Dillaway of the Liberal National Party. Farmer defeated Dillaway at the 2015 election to regain Bulimba for Labor and was re-elected in 2017 and 2020.

Career
Farmer served as the Deputy Speaker of the Legislative assembly from 2015 to 2017, and was appointed Minister for Child Safety, Youth and Women and Minister for the Prevention of Domestic and Family Violence on 12 December 2017 at the start of the Second Palaszczuk Ministry.

Farmer was born in Brisbane, and received a Bachelor of Speech Therapy from the University of Queensland and a Postgraduate Diploma of Administrative Studies from Kedron Park College of Advanced Education. She was a public servant and Labor Party organiser prior to her election.

See also
Second Palaszczuk Ministry
Third Palaszczuk Ministry

References

1961 births
Living people
Members of the Queensland Legislative Assembly
Australian Labor Party members of the Parliament of Queensland
21st-century Australian politicians
21st-century Australian women politicians
Women members of the Queensland Legislative Assembly